Ringworm Interiors is the debut album from Ohio alternative rock band Circus Devils.  Released in 2001, the album is a psychedelic collage of musical vignettes with moods ranging from aggressive and disorienting to haunting and dreamy.

Members of Circus Devils include Robert Pollard, founder of the band Guided by Voices, along with producer / musician Todd Tobias, and guitarist Tim Tobias.

Reception 

"A psychedelic boat rides that leads to a poorly lit and wicked place, where even the nursery rhymes of youth become foreboding. Beauty dances with ugliness, much like it does in the work of Roman Polanski and David Lynch, filmmakers who are drawn to the amalgam of good and evil that permeates the real world. Furthering the connection, many of (Todd) Tobias' instrumental beads could be effectively re-scored to works like Twin Peaks and Rosemary's Baby"
- Bart Bealmear / Allmusic.com 

"Likely to appeal to music fans interested in extreme rock, or in music which is rooted in rock but which pushes the usual boundaries. This is a psychedelic mindtrip with heavy metal textures melding with non-sequitur lyrics delivered by many means of vocalizing (few of which would be described as "good singing"), and everything's cloaked in more feedback and fuzz than you can imagine.  While some of the more direct songs demonstrate that hard rock is at this music's core, this is rock music that's been transformed into something dark and strange. With Ringworm Interiors, my first reaction was to yell "What the hell is this?" and quickly throw it aside.  Those who give up too soon, however, miss being taken deep into a unique musical world.  It's not a world likely to appeal to mass audiences, but it is an unmistakably distinct one that you won't soon forget." 
- Dave Heaton / Erasing Clouds

Track listing

 "Devilspeak"
 "Feel Try Fury" 
 "Buffalo Spiders"
 "North Morning Silver Trip"
 "Ringworm Interiors"
 "Spectacle"
 "You First"
 "Knifesong"
 "Kingdom of teeth"
 "Oil Birds" 
 "Lizard Food" 
 "Not So Fast"
 "Apparent the Red Angus" 
 "Playhouse Hostage"
 "Straps Hold Up the Jaw"
 "Correcto" 
 "Star Peppered Wheat Germ"
 "Silver Eyeballs" 
 "Decathalon" 
 "Peace needle"
 "Drill Sgt. Soul"
 "Protect Thy Interests" 
 "Let's Go Back to Bed" 
 "Sterility Megaplant" 
 "New You"
 "Circus Devils Theme"

References

External links 
 the Official Circus Devils site
 [ Circus Devils at allmusic.com]

Circus Devils albums
2001 debut albums